Straziami ma di baci saziami (internationally released as Torture Me But Kill Me with Kisses) is a 1968 Italian comedy film directed by Dino Risi. The film parodies Italian photonovels and the popular subculture. It had a great commercial success.
All the DVD releases (in Italy, too) have the credits in English.

Plot 
Marino and Marisa meet for the first time in Rome during a folklore festival. He politely chats her up, but she does not want to show any interest in him. Later that year, Marino arrives in Sacrofante Marche, Marisa's mountain village in the region Marche, where he has found a job as a barber and wants to pursue the courting of Marisa. The two fall in love and have plans for their future together, but Marisa's father does not approve of the relationship. Desperate, the two attempt to commit suicide laying on rail tracks, but just get scolded by the train conductor. Providence brings a handy solution when Marisa's dad dies of natural causes, and the two can see a brighter future. Unfortunately, Marino's landlady (a widow, who fancies the young man) is jealous of their relationship and hints that once Marisa spend the night in an hotel with Guido Scortichini. Blidned by jealousy, Marino confronts Marisa who, heartbroken, leaves him and goes to Rome. Marino finds out that the landlady was lying to him and desperately starts searching for Marisa in the eternal city. He finds few clues about her whereabouts, but not a concrete lead. He ends up pennyless and depressed wondering the streets of Rome. In the meantime, heartbroken Marisa has jumped between temporary jobs while trying to forget about Marino. She ends up working for Umberto Ciceri, a deaf and mute tailor. His kindness and sensibility make Marisa finally feel better. On the other end, Marino hits rock bottom when he decides to kill himself on New Year by jumping in the river Tiber from the bridge Cavour. But he is saved by Mr Okay and ends up in hospital. Unexpectedly, Marisa shows up to visit him having read about his suicide attempt on the newspaper. Marino is delighted to have finally found Marisa, but the joy does not last long since she is now Mrs Ciceri, after marrying her employer. She quickly leaves and Marino is "comforted" by his bed mate who uses Marino's misfortunes to come up with lottery numbers and offers to share the winning. The lottery numbers come out and they do win. Some time later, Marisa finds Marino in her husband's tailor lab. Marino is now rich and overconfident and wants to toy with Marisa, who he thinks wronged her. In the meantime, kind Umberto, unable to hear anything, is unaware of their previous history and gets a liking for Marino. Marisa rejects Marino but, because of his insistence, agrees to at least 'consume' their interrupted love story. Despite not being able to go through with the passionate act, Marisa and Marino's love is re-kindled. But they can't be together while she is married to Umberto. So, they end up with an evil plan: to kill Umberto so they can be together. Disguised as a gas explosion, the murder attempt does not kill Umberto. Instead, he regains his voice and hearing. Then Umberto explains that he made a vow to his mother death bed that, if he ever regained his lost senses, he will become a monk. With his blessing, Marisa and Marino can finally be together.

Cast 
Nino Manfredi: Balestrini Marino
Pamela Tiffin: Di Giovanni Marisa
Ugo Tognazzi: Umberto Ciceri
Moira Orfei: Adelaide
Gigi Ballista: Engineer
Livio Lorenzon: Artemio Di Giovanni
Pietro Tordi: Uncle Arduino
Samson Burke: Scortichini Guido
Checco Durante: The Owner of Employment Agency

References

External links

1968 films
Commedia all'italiana
Films directed by Dino Risi
Adultery in films
Films with screenplays by Age & Scarpelli
Films scored by Armando Trovajoli
Films shot in Abruzzo
1960s Italian-language films
1960s Italian films